The Pakistan Naval Station Rahat, or PNS Rahat Hospital, is a Pakistan Naval hospital and a medical treatment facility. It is located at Karsaz Road in Karachi, Sindh, Pakistan.

History
PNS Rahat was established in 1954, by the United States Navy. It was commissioned on 20 October 1994, and Vice-Admiral Rashid Ahmad Khan was appointed its first Surgeon-General of the PNS Rahat. The hospital has a team of Pakistan Navy medical doctors and surgeons, providing the best services to naval officers.

The hospital was first upgraded in 1973.

See also
 List of hospitals in Karachi

References

External links 
Pakistan Navy Hospitals

Hospital buildings completed in 1954
Hospitals in Karachi
Hospitals established in 1954
Rahat
Military medical facilities in Pakistan